Eagle's Nest Park is a scenic lookout in the town of Bancroft, Ontario, Canada. It is built on the top of a sheer rock face and overlooks the northern portions of the town, the York River and Bancroft Airport.

The name comes from a likely apocryphal story that takes place in 1883. Mr. and Mrs. Gaebel were in their yard when they heard the screams of a child that an eagle was attempting to carry off. The eagle was frightened off and the child unharmed, but the Gaebel's decided they should remove the eagle to prevent such attacks in the future. They lowered their son, 12-year-old William, down to the nest that was in a fir tree on the cliff face. He destroyed the eggs and the eagle left, never to return. Eagles were reported to have used the site in the past, but the last recorded confirmed sighting in the area was in 1918.

Today, the purported site of the action features the Hawkwatch Trail, capped by a large wooden platform that provides views out over the town. The trail passes the footings of a former fire watchtower. The site was recently redeveloped with several additional trails being added and a number of interpretive centers.

References

Scenic viewpoints
Outdoor structures in Canada
Tourist attractions in Ontario
Buildings and structures in Ontario